Montague is a township in eastern Ontario, Canada, in Lanark County on the Rideau River. The township administrative offices are located on Roger Stevens Drive east of Smiths Falls.

Communities
The township comprises the communities of Andrewsville, Atironto, Kilmarnock, Nolans Corners, Numogate, Poolers Corners, Rosedale and Welsh.

Demographics 

Transportation
The main roads in the township are the east–west County Road 43, the north–south Ontario Highway 15, and the northeast-southwest Roger Stevens Drive.  The Rideau Trail passes through the township between Merrickville and Smiths Falls.

See also
List of townships in Ontario

References

External links

Township municipalities in Ontario
Lower-tier municipalities in Ontario
Municipalities in Lanark County